Maegan Manasse (born April 16, 1995) is an American tennis player.

Career
She has career-high WTA rankings of 327 in singles, reached on July 15, 2019, and 175 in doubles, achieved on July 29, 2019.

Manasse won a WTA 125 title at the 2018 Houston Challenger, in the doubles draw, partnering Jessica Pegula. She has also won seven doubles titles on the ITF Circuit.

WTA 125 tournament finals

Doubles: 1 (1 title)

ITF finals

Singles: 2 (2 runner–ups)

Doubles: 10 (7 titles, 3 runner–ups)

External links
 
 

1995 births
Living people
American female tennis players
Tennis people from California
21st-century American women
California Golden Bears women's tennis players